Harry August Westli (10 May 1918 – 2 September 1942) was a Norwegian trade unionist who was imprisoned and died during the occupation of Norway by Nazi Germany.

Harry Westli was born in Sande i Vestfold as the son of Petter Rikard Westli and his Swedish wife Emma Kristine. He had three siblings. He had gone through middle school, and worked at the factory Lilleborg, where he was the union steward.

On 9 September 1941, the so-called milk strike occurred in Oslo. The Nazi German occupants of Norway ordered a harsh crackdown on the striking workers, and martial law was declared the next day. A local union leader, Rolf Wickstrøm, and chief jurist in the Confederation of Trade Unions, Viggo Hansteen were executed immediately. Arrested on 12 September, Harry Westli was sentenced to death together with Ludvik Buland and Josef Larsson, but the three were later reprieved, and instead given a lifelong jail sentence. Westli was imprisoned at both Grini and Akershus Fortress, before being sent to Germany on 16 October 1941. While imprisoned here he contracted tuberculosis. He died in September 1942 at a hospital in Hamburg.

References

1918 births
1942 deaths
Norwegian trade unionists
Norwegian people of Swedish descent
Norwegian civilians killed in World War II
Norwegian prisoners sentenced to death 
20th-century deaths from tuberculosis
Grini concentration camp prisoners
Politicians who died in Nazi concentration camps
Tuberculosis deaths in Germany